Helochares obscurus is a species of Hydrophilidae in the Hydrophilinae subfamily that can be found in Austria, Baltic states, Croatia, France, Germany, Great Britain including the Isle of Man, Greece, Hungary, Italy, Poland, Scandinavia, Switzerland, and the Netherlands.

References

External links
Helochares obscurus on Zin.ru
Helochares obscurus on Biopix

Hydrophilinae
Beetles described in 1776
Beetles of Europe
Taxa named by Otto Friedrich Müller